Zain Khan Koka (died 1601) was a leading official in the Mugal Empire under Akbar, including serving for a time as governor of Kabul.

Zain Khan was the son of Akbar's wetnurse and thus received the title "Koka" which means foster brother.  He was an accomplished musician besides being a military leader.  In 1585 he was made one of the leaders of the Mughal forces fighting to bring the Yusufzai Afghan tribe under Mughal control.  In 1596 he was made governor of Kabul.

Daughter's marriage with Jahangir
In 1596 Prince Salim (future Emperor Jahangir) became violently enamoured of Zain Khan Koka's daughter Khas Mahal, and meditated marrying her. Akbar was displeased at the impropriety. The cause of Akbar's objection was Sahib Jamal who had already been married to Salim. Akbar objected to marriages between near relations.

However, when Akbar saw that Salim's heart was immoderately affected, he, of necessity, gave his consent. There was a great feast and joy. The marriage took place on the eve of 28 June 1596 at the house of Hamida Banu Begum. She was known by the title of Khas Mahal, and was still living in the reign of Emperor Shah Jahan.

References

Sources
John F. Richards, The New Cambridge History of India: The Mughal Empire (New York: Cambridge University Press, 19930 p. 50.
description connected with painting of Zain Khan

1601 deaths
Mughal Empire people
Year of birth unknown